Secondary cutaneous amyloidosis is a skin condition that occurs following PUVA therapy and in benign and malignant cutaneous neoplasms in which deposits of amyloid may be found.

See also 
 Amyloidosis
 Skin lesion
 List of cutaneous conditions

References 

Skin conditions resulting from errors in metabolism